Georg Smefjell (9 June 1937 – 6 December 2015) was a Norwegian ice hockey player. He played for the Norwegian national ice hockey team, and  participated at the Winter Olympics in 1964 and in 1968. He was awarded Gullpucken as best Norwegian ice hockey player in 1969.

He was born in Mysen.

References

External links

1937 births
2015 deaths
Frisk Asker Ishockey players
Ice hockey players at the 1964 Winter Olympics
Ice hockey players at the 1968 Winter Olympics
Norwegian ice hockey players
Olympic ice hockey players of Norway
People from Eidsberg
Sportspeople from Viken (county)